The Samuel R. Pitts Plantation, also known as the Greenwood Plantation or the William J. Benton House, is a historic house on a plantation in Pittsview, Alabama, U.S..

History
The house was erected in 1846 for Dr. John Benson Henry. It was later purchased by Samuel Eberharts.

The house was purchased by Samuel Rutherford Pitts in 1874. After he died, his brother Henry Bragg Pitts moved into the house with his family, and it was later inherited by his daughter Evelyn, who lived there with her husband Richard Malcolm Mitchell. After her husband died in the 1930s, Evelyn lived in the house with her three unmarried sisters; they were joined by their brother in 1961.

The house was purchased by William R. Benson Sr. in 1989.

Architectural significance
The house was designed in the Greek Revival architectural style. It has been listed on the National Register of Historic Places since June 25, 1992.

References

Houses on the National Register of Historic Places in Alabama
Greek Revival architecture in Alabama
Houses completed in 1846
Houses in Russell County, Alabama
Plantations in Alabama
Historic districts on the National Register of Historic Places in Alabama
National Register of Historic Places in Russell County, Alabama